The Yamaha YZF-R125  is a sport motorcycle designed by Yamaha and manufactured by MBK Industrie since 2008. In 2023 the model is in its fourth generation.

First generation: (2008–2013) 
In 2008, the bike initially came available as a four stroke replacement for the TZR125. 
Entering the thin market of small displacement 4-stroke sport bikes, it quickly gained traction and became a popular choice for young riders.

Specifications 
Specifications for EU version.

Second generation: (2014–2018) 
In 2014, Yamaha gave a facelift to the model, with a slightly tweaked fairing set, an upside-down front fork and a full LCD dashboard. The model launched without ABS, but it became an option for 2015. To comply with EU regulations, ABS is a standard equipment on all bikes since 2017. This may cause minor differences in weight, electric or other specifications.

Specifications
These specifications come from the owner's manual of a 2017 model with ABS.

Third generation: (2019–2022) 
The 2019 model has a new rear swingarm, changes to the frame and bodywork, a new engine with Variable Valve Actuation (VVA).
There is a small 2021 update, that adds a vapor canister to the fuel system, presumably to help the bike comply with the more strict Euro 5 emission standard.

Specifications
As per the owner's manual of the 2021 model.

Fourth generation: (2023–on) 
The bike yet again received a slight overhaul for the 2023 model year. The changes include some minor tweaks to the suspension like a different caster angle at the front (it is now 26°), and a shorter swingarm travel at the rear (it is now 110 mm down from 114 mm). The front half of the bike has reworked fairings and a new 5” full color TFT dash with smartphone connectivity.

References

External links 
Official website (United Kingdom)

YZF-R125
Sport bikes
Motorcycles introduced in 2008